Agnosine is a comune in the province of Brescia, Lombardy, Italy. Is a town of 1,825 inhabitants (2011).

References

Cities and towns in Lombardy